The Alliance of Democrats was a loose political international which operated from 2005 to 2012. While it did not publish an official manifesto, it consisted of a broad array of political parties that identified as centre-right, centrist, and centre-left. It was founded by the United States Democratic Party, the European Democratic Party (EDP) and the Council of Asian Liberals and Democrats (CALD).

The Alliance included members of the Centrist Democrat International (such as the Christian Democrat Party of Chile and the Democratic Union of Catalonia) and the Liberal International (such as all members of the Council of Asian Liberals and Democrats), as well as former members of Socialist International (the Indian National Congress), Israel's relatively new Kadima party, and conservative parties such as the Democratic Party of Serbia, which is also member of the International Democrat Union.

The Alliance was co-chaired by François Bayrou, Francesco Rutelli and Ellen Tauscher, while after 2008 Gianni Vernetti, who was also co-president of the Italian Liberal Group, was the Alliance's coordinator.

Past members

National parties and groups

International coalitions

Notable individual members
 Shukria Barakzai (Afghan politician and Muslim feminist)
 Pasqual Maragall (former president of the Generalitat de Catalunya)
 Ona Juknevičienė (MEP, EDP member)
 Paweł Piskorski (MEP, EDP member)
 Yolande Mukagasana (writer, witness to the genocide in Rwanda)

Leadership
Co-Chairs: François Bayrou, Francesco Rutelli and Ellen Tauscher (2005–...)
Coordinator: Gianni Vernetti (2008–...)

Notes

External links
Official website

Alliance of Democrats
2005_establishments_in_the_United_States 
2012_disestablishments_in_the_United_States 
Former international organizations 
Centrist political advocacy groups in the United States 
Centrism in Europe 
Centrism in Asia